The Journal of Early Childhood Research is a triannual peer-reviewed academic journal that covers research on child health, early education, pediatrics, psychology, social work, sociology, and teaching in early childhood. The editor-in-chief is Cathy Nutbrown (University of Sheffield). It was established in 2003 and is currently published by SAGE Publications.

Abstracting and indexing 
The Journal of Early Childhood Research is abstracted and indexed in:
 British Education Index
 Current Contents/Social and Behavioral Sciences
 Educational Research Abstracts Online
 Family Index Database
 Social Sciences Citation Index

External links 
 

SAGE Publishing academic journals
English-language journals
Developmental psychology journals
Education journals
Triannual journals
Publications established in 2003